Wilhelm Friedrich "Willi" Stadel (9 July 1912 – 23 March 1999) was a German gymnast who won a team gold medal at the 1936 Summer Olympics. His best individual result was sixth place on the floor.

References

1912 births
1999 deaths
German male artistic gymnasts
Olympic gymnasts of Germany
Gymnasts at the 1936 Summer Olympics
Olympic gold medalists for Germany
Olympic medalists in gymnastics
Medalists at the 1936 Summer Olympics
20th-century German people